Prowl may refer to:

Prowl, walking while partially squatting to maintain a low profile
Predation, a biological interaction where a predator, an organism that is hunting, feeds on its prey
Prowl (Transformers), a fictional robot superhero character in the Transformers robot superhero franchise.
Prowl (album), a 2006 album by cellist Erik Friedlander
Prowl (film), a horror film starring Bruce Payne